Saviours is an American heavy metal band formed in Oakland, California, in 2004. Since then, they have released five albums and two EPs.

Members 
Austin Barber – vocals, lead and rhythm guitar
Sonny Christopher Reinhardt – lead and rhythm guitar
Andy Anderson – bass
Scott Batiste – drums

Former members 
Cyrus Comiskey (Black Fork, Drunk Horse) – bass
Dean Tyler Morris (aka Balls Larson) – Lead and rhythm guitar
Mag Delana (Yaphet Kotto, Bread and Circuits) – Lead and rhythm guitar
Carson Binks – Bass

Discography

EPs 
Warship (2005) (Level Plane Records)
Cavern of Mind (2007) (Kemado Records)

Studio albums 
Crucifire (2006) (Level Plane Records)
Into Abaddon (2008) (Kemado Records)
Accelerated Living (2009) (Kemado Records)
Death's Procession (2011) (Kemado Records) (7.4/10)
Palace of Vision (2015) (Listenable Records)

Singles 
2008: "Narcotic Sea" (Kemado Records)

Other appearances 
Metal Swim – Adult Swim compilation album (2010)

References

External links 
 Official band page at Kemado Records
 Saviours at Encyclopaedia Metallum

American doom metal musical groups
American stoner rock musical groups
Musical groups established in 2004
Heavy metal musical groups from California
Level Plane Records artists
Listenable Records artists